

Following is a list of rivers of classical antiquity stating the Latin name, the equivalent English name, and also, in some cases, Greek and local name.  The scope is intended to include, at least, rivers named and known widely in the Roman empire.  This includes some rivers beyond the bounds of the Roman empire at its peak.

Map

For locations of rivers having coordinates below, see linked OpenStreetMap, by clicking on "Map all coordinates using: OpenStreetMap".

Rivers
Rivers, with approximate regions, area:

¹ - Latinized spelling of a Greek name.

See also

 List of European rivers with alternative names
 Latin names of Portuguese rivers
 List of Roman place names in Britain
 Roman sites in the United Kingdom
 Romano-British

Notes

References

External links
 Digital Atlas of the Roman Empire, Centre for Digital Humanities, University of Gothenburg, Sweden.
 Dr. J. G. Th. Grässe, Orbis Latinus: Lexikon lateinischer geographischer Namen des Mittelalters und der Neuzeit, online at the Bavarian State Library
Grässe, Orbis Latinus, online at Columbia University

Rivers
Lists of rivers
Hydronymy
Place names by type of place